Administration may refer to:

Management of organizations
 Management, the act of directing people towards accomplishing a goal: the process of dealing with or controlling things or people.
 Administrative assistant, traditionally known as a Secretary, or also known as an administrative officer, administrative support specialist, or management assistant: a person whose work consists of supporting management 
 Administration (government), management in or of government, the management of public affairs; government.
 Administrative division, a term for an administrative region within a country that is created for the purpose of managing of land and the affairs of people.
 Academic administration, a branch of an academic institution responsible for the maintenance and supervision of the institution
 Arts administration, a field that concerns business operations around an art organization
 Business administration, the performance or management of business operations
 Bachelor of Business Administration, bachelor's degree in commerce and Business administration
 Master of Business Administration, master's degree in Business administration
 Doctor of Business Administration, doctoral degree
 Central administration, the highest administrative department of an organization
 Engineering administration, a branch of Engineering
 Health administration, a field relating to leadership, management and administration of public health systems, hospitals and hospital networks 
 Military administration, the techniques and systems used by military services involved in the management of the armed forces
 Public administration, advancement and implementation of government policy, or the management of public programs
 Master of Public Administration, master's degree in Public administration
 Doctor of Public Administration, doctoral degree
 Administration (law), whereby an insolvent company can continue trading under supervision
 Administration (British football): consequences in football when the club (as a business) enters legal administration.
 Administration in United Kingdom law

Other uses
 Administration (probate law), administration of an estate on death
 Database administration, the function of managing and maintaining DBMS software
 Drug administration, delivery of a drug into the body
 Route of administration, path by which a drug, fluid, poison or other substance is taken into body
 Land administration, the way in which the rules of Land tenure are applied and made operational
 Network administration, configuration of a computer network
 System administration, the upkeep, configuration, and reliable operation of computer systems

See also
Administrator (disambiguation)
Bureaucracy
 Presidency (US usage, as in "the Biden administration")